The Dr. Alexander C. Brabson House is a historic house in rural Macon County, North Carolina. It is located off Academy Road (SR 1117) near the community of Otto.

Description and history 
The house consists of a -story main block with a side gable roof, and a rear single-story ell. A shed-roof porch extends across the main facade, in which a pair of windows flank a double-leaf door. The house was built in 1884 by Dr. Alexander C. Brabson, a longtime local country doctor known for his treatment of milk sickness.

The house was listed on the National Register of Historic Places on August 23, 1990.

See also
National Register of Historic Places listings in Macon County, North Carolina

References

Houses on the National Register of Historic Places in North Carolina
Houses completed in 1884
Houses in Macon County, North Carolina
National Register of Historic Places in Macon County, North Carolina